This is a list of newspapers in Wyoming, United States.

Daily and weekly newspapers (currently published)This is a list of daily newspapers currently published in Wyoming. For weekly newspapers, see List of newspapers in Wyoming.

See also